Electron deficiency (and electron-deficient) is jargon that is used in two contexts: species that violate the octet rule because they have too few valence electrons and species that happen to follow the octet rule but have electron-acceptor properties, forming donor-acceptor charge-transfer salts.

Octet rule violations

Traditionally, "electron-deficiency" is used as a general descriptor for boron hydrides and other molecules which do not have enough valence electrons to form localized (2-centre 2-electron) bonds joining all atoms. For example, diborane (B2H6) would require a minimum of 7 localized bonds with 14 electrons to join all 8 atoms, but there are only 12 valence electrons. A similar situation exists in trimethylaluminium. The electron deficiency in such compounds is similar to metallic bonding.

Electron-acceptor molecules

Alternatively, electron-deficiency describes molecules or ions that function as electron acceptors.  Such electron-deficient species obey the octet rule, but they have (usually mild) oxidizing properties. 1,3,5-Trinitrobenzene and related polynitrated aromatic compounds are often described as electron-deficient. Electron deficiency can be measured by linear free-energy relationships: "a strongly negative ρ value indicates a large electron demand at the reaction center, from which it may be concluded that a highly electron-deficient center, perhaps an incipient carbocation, is involved."

References 

Chemical bonding